Intelsat V F-5, then named Intelsat 505, was a communications satellite operated by COMSAT. Launched in 1982, it was the fifth of fifteen Intelsat V satellites to be launched. The Intelsat V series was constructed by Ford Aerospace, based on the Intelsat V satellite bus. Intelsat V F-5 was part of an advanced series of satellites designed to provide greater telecommunications capacity for Intelsat's global network.

Satellite 
The Intelsat V F-5 satellite was box-shaped, measuring 1.66 by 2.1 by 1.77 metres; solar arrays spanned 15.9 metres tip to tip. The arrays, supplemented by nickel-hydrogen batteries during eclipse, provided 1800 watts of power. The payload housed 21 C-band and 4 Ku-band transponders. It could accommodate 15,000 two-way voice circuits and two TV channels simultaneously. It had a launch mass of 1928 kg. He also carried a Maritime Communications Services (MCS) package for INMARSAT. The satellite was deactivated in August 1999.

Launch 
The Intelsat V F-5 satellite was successfully launched into space on 28 September 1982 at 23:17:00 UTC, by means of an Atlas SLV-3D Centaur-D1AR vehicle from the Cape Canaveral Air Force Station, Florida, United States.

See also 

 1982 in spaceflight

References 

Spacecraft launched in 1982
Intelsat satellites
1982 in spaceflight